Ketki Joshi Dave (born 23 June 1960) is an Indian actress. She has starred in many Gujarati and Hindi films including Aamdani Atthanni Kharcha Rupaiya, Money Hai Toh Honey Hai, Kal Ho Naa Ho, and Hello! Hum Lallan Bol Rahe Hain. She also has many television credits to her name, some of which are Nach Baliye 2, Bigg Boss 2, Kyunki Saas Bhi Kabhi Bahu Thi and Behenein.

Personal life
Ketki was born on 23 June 1960 to the parents Sarita Joshi, an actress and Pravin Joshi, a theatre director. She has a younger sister Purbi Joshi who is also an actress and an anchor. She was married to the actor Rasik Dave, (widow on 30.07.2022) with whom she ran a Gujarati theatre company.

Filmography

Television

Films

References

External links

 
 

1960 births
Living people
Actresses from Mumbai
Gujarati people
Indian women comedians
Indian stage actresses
Indian film actresses
Indian television actresses
Indian soap opera actresses
Actresses in Hindi cinema
Actresses in Gujarati cinema
Actresses in Hindi television
Gujarati theatre
20th-century Indian actresses
21st-century Indian actresses
Bigg Boss (Hindi TV series) contestants